On the fly (on-the-fly as an adjective) is a term meaning that something is done immediately, in real time, not afterwards.

On the Fly may refer to:
On the Fly (album), a 2007 album by Irish folk group Patrick Street
On the Fly, a 2012 American reality documentary television series on TLC
On-The-Fly Calibration in observational astronomy
On-the-fly encryption, a method used by some disk encryption software
On-the-fly programming or live coding, improvised and interactive